Gordon Richard Fincham (8 January 1935 – June 2012) was an English former footballer who played as a half back. Born in Peterborough, he made 250 appearances in the Football League for Leicester City, Plymouth Argyle and Luton Town.

References

1935 births
2012 deaths
Sportspeople from Peterborough
English footballers
Leicester City F.C. players
Plymouth Argyle F.C. players
Luton Town F.C. players
Port Elizabeth City F.C. players
English Football League players
Association football midfielders